WREH (Reach FM) was a 100,000-watt FM station, broadcasting on 90.5 MHz. Its city of license was Cypress Quarters in Okeechobee County, Florida. The station went on the air in 2004. Reach Communications, ReachFM's parent company, was formed in association with Calvary Chapel of Fort Lauderdale, Florida. When it was active, ReachFM's programming was geared towards a diverse active Christian audience. According to its website, WREH's last day of programming was March 30, 2016. On February 15, 2017, Reach Communications informed the Federal Communications Commission (FCC) that WREH had ceased broadcasting on February 10; on April 18, 2017, it surrendered the station's license, and the license was cancelled by the FCC on April 19, 2017.

Translators
ReachFM was heard throughout the state of Florida on more than 40 translators:

The station's programming could also have been heard on four full-power FM radio digital subchannels in Florida:

 WWJK-HD2 107.3 Green Cove Springs (Jacksonville)
 WMGE-HD2  94.9 Miami - Fort Lauderdale
 WRUM-HD2 100.3 Orlando
 WKGR-HD2  98.7 Wellington (West Palm Beach)

Sale of translators
It was announced on July 2, 2012 that Reach Communications was selling the following translators to Beasley Broadcasting for $150,000, which would serve as rebroadcasters for WWCN 770 ESPN:

These translators now serve as repeaters for WRXK-FM HD2 (going by the slogan The Link) along with the following translator:

Some translators were sold to Clear Channel (now iHeartMedia), which sparked rumors that Reach FM would sell all of its remaining translators to iHeartMedia. 
 In Orlando, W283AN was sold to iHeartMedia and changed formats into an urban contemporary-formatted, "104.5 The Beat". 
 In Tampa, 88.3 moved to 99.1 and became one of the affiliates for classic rock-formatted "Thunder Tampa Bay" along with W290BJ and W233AV, while 89.3 which moved to 99.9 became branded as "ALT 99.9" and converted to an alternative formatted station. However, after many complaints from WXJB, due to interference, W207BU switched frequencies from 99.9 to 100.3, and rebranded as alternative-formatted "ALT 100.3".
 In Miami, W228BV moved to 93.5 and converted into a country formatted station, "93.5 The Bull"

One translator got sold to Beasley Media Group in November 2014 and became a repeater for WSBR on 740 AM.

References

External links
Station website

REH
Radio stations established in 2004
2004 establishments in Florida
Radio stations disestablished in 2017
2017 disestablishments in Florida
Defunct radio stations in the United States
Defunct religious radio stations in the United States
REH